The 1925–26 season was the 45th season in the history of Nelson F.C. and their fifth as a professional club in the Football League. The team competed in the Third Division North for the second consecutive season, having finished as runners-up to Darlington in the previous campaign. Nelson had a new manager in Percy Smith, following the departure of David Wilson in the summer of 1925. The team played well for the majority of the season, and achieved several good victories, including 7–0 wins against Tranmere Rovers and Wigan Borough. Nelson ended the season on 43 points, with a record of 16 wins, 11 draws and 15 defeats in their 42 matches.

Nelson entered the FA Cup in the First Round, but were knocked out at that stage by Wigan Borough. In their 43 competitive matches, Nelson used a total of 25 different players. The majority of the championship-winning team remained with Nelson. New signings included centre forward Jimmy Hampson, who went on to become an England international, centre-half George Wilson and outside forward Edwin Earle. With 20 goals in 32 appearances, Joe Eddleston was the team's top goalscorer for the fifth season in succession. Wilson was the only player to appear in every match during the campaign, scoring five goals in 43 games.

The highest attendance of the season at the club's Seedhill stadium was 14,143 against Bradford Park Avenue on 10 April 1926. Nelson's smallest crowd of the season was 3,989 in the penultimate home match of the campaign on 20 April 1926 against Chesterfield.

Football League Third Division North

Key

H = Home match
A = Away match

In Result column, Nelson's score shown first
Goalscorers shown in order of first goal scored

Match results

FA Cup
Nelson entered the FA Cup at the First Round stage, the first time in their history they had played in the competition proper, having previously never progressed past the qualifying rounds. Nelson were drawn against fellow Third Division North outfit Wigan Borough, who they had faced in the Fifth Qualifying Round in the 1923–24 season. Then, Nelson had been beaten by one goal in a replay at Seedhill, following a 1–1 draw in the away tie. The team went into the cup match on 2 December 1925 having won five of their previous six league fixtures, and were unbeaten since the 0–1 loss to Coventry City on 3 October 1925. Nelson fielded the same starting line-up that had won the last match against Walsall, but were beaten 0–3 before a crowd of 3,836 spectators.

Key

A = Away match
R1 = First Round

In Result column, Nelson's score shown first
Goalscorers shown in order of first goal scored

Match result

Player statistics
Key to positions

CF = Centre forward
FB = Fullback
GK = Goalkeeper

HB = Half-back
IF = Inside forward
OF = Outside forward

Statistics

References
General

Specific

Nelson F.C. seasons
Nelson